Van Heusen is a surname. Notable people with the surname include:

Billy Van Heusen (born 1946), American football player
Jimmy Van Heusen (1916–1990), American composer
John Manning Van Heusen Dutch immigrant in America, after whom PVH Corp. was originally named.

Fictional characters 
 Juliet Van Heusen, a character in Wizards of Waverly Place

See also
Van Heusen (brand), a clothing brand owned by Authentic Brands Group (previously by PVH)

Surnames of Dutch origin